Alexander White (28 January 1916 – 3 November 1995) was a Scottish professional football right back who played in the Football League for Chelsea, and Swindon Town.

Playing career
White was born in Armadale, Scotland. He started his football career with Westrigg United and Bonnyrigg Rose Athletic F.C. before signing for Chelsea in 1937. He was 30 years old when he started his first team game against Leeds United on 14 September 1946 (Chelsea won 3–0). White made a further 18 appearances for Chelsea; his last game on 1 January 1948 was a draw with Blackburn Rovers.

In July 1948 he transferred to Swindon Town in the Third Division, making 38 appearances before joining Southport in July 1950.

Coaching career
White managed Uxbridge F.C. in London in 1953 before going to Eastbourne in 1954.

Career statistics

References

1916 births
1995 deaths
Scottish footballers
Bonnyrigg Rose Athletic F.C. players
Chelsea F.C. players
Southport F.C. players
Uxbridge F.C. managers
Eastbourne Town F.C. managers
Scottish football managers
Association football fullbacks
People from Armadale, West Lothian
Falkirk F.C. wartime guest players
Scottish Junior Football Association players
Airdrieonians F.C. (1878) wartime guest players